A by-election for the Australian House of Representatives division of Werriwa was held on 28 January 1994. It was triggered by the resignation of sitting Labor Party member and former minister John Kerin.

The by-election was won by Labor Party candidate Mark Latham, retaining the seat for his party.

The by-election was marked by a swing against the ALP of almost twelve per cent. Much of this swing benefited minor party candidates, in particular the anti-immigration party Australians Against Further Immigration, whose candidate Robyn Spencer polled 7.24 per cent. Single issue parties are rarely able to sustain such high votes at a general election.

Due to its status as a safe ALP seat, the Liberal Party originally decided not to field a candidate in this by-election but it was overruled by leader John Hewson and saw Charlie Lynn becoming the Liberal candidate by being handpicked by Hewson rather than going through the usual rank and file preselection process.

Results

Aftermath

Two years later, Latham was re-elected as the member for Werriwa at the 1996 federal election, despite the Labor Party losing several seats—and as a consequence, losing office—including the neighbouring divisions of Lindsay, Hughes and Macarthur. In December 2003, Latham became Leader of the Opposition and led his party to defeat at the 2004 federal election. Although re-elected as leader in the aftermath of that election, in January 2005 he stepped down as Labor leader and the member for Werriwa citing health concerns, triggering the 2005 Werriwa by-election.

Latham's defeated opponent, Charlie Lynn of the Liberal Party, was selected to the New South Wales Legislative Council in 1995 filling a vacancy caused by the resignation of Ted Pickering.

See also
 List of Australian federal by-elections

References

Werriwa by-election
New South Wales federal by-elections
Werriwa by-election